Trivor is one of the high mountain peaks of the Hispar Muztagh, a subrange of the Karakoram range in the Shimshal Valley, Gilgit-Baltistan of Pakistan. The height given here is from a Russian 1:100,000 topographic map.

There have been only two successful climbs of this peak; the first ascent was in 1960 by a British–American party.

Sources
 Jerzy Wala, Orographical Sketch Map of the Karakoram, Swiss Foundation for Alpine Research, Zurich, 1990.
 Jill Neate, High Asia: an illustrated history of the 7,000 metre peaks, The Mountaineers, 1989.

Notes

Mountains of Gilgit-Baltistan
Seven-thousanders of the Karakoram